Xi'an railway station is one of the two main passenger railway stations of Xi'an, the capital of China's Shaanxi Province. Located on the Longhai Railway and just to the north of Xi'an's historical walled city, the station had long been the main train station for the Xi'an metropolitan area. With the opening of Xi'an North railway station on the northern outskirts of the city in 2011, most of the high-speed services, including the G- and D-series trains of the Zhengzhou–Xi'an high-speed railway, have been transferred to the new station. Xi'an railway station remains the main station for all conventional rail service in the city, including the overnight Z-series expresses, T-series express trains, and all slower services.

History 
As of 2021, works are underway to upgrade the station, increasing the number of platforms and introducing a new station building to the north of the railway line. The new station building was opened on 31 May 2021.

Metro station
Xi'anzhan station on Line 4 is the metro station serving the Xi'an railway station. The metro station opened on 25 September 2022. In the long-term planning, Line 7 will also serve the Xi'an railway station.

Gallery

See also
 Xi'an North railway station

References

Stations on the Longhai Railway
Railway stations in Xi'an
Railway stations in China opened in 1935